Jani Hartikainen (born 16 September 1975) is a Finnish football player who currently plays for the Finnish premiership Veikkausliiga club KuPS in Finland.

References
Guardian Football

1975 births
Living people
People from Nurmes
Finnish footballers
Kuopion Palloseura players
Veikkausliiga players
Association football defenders
Sportspeople from North Karelia